Franklin Pierce Lively (August 17, 1921 – March 12, 2016) was a United States circuit judge of the United States Court of Appeals for the Sixth Circuit.

Education and career

Born in Louisville, Kentucky, Lively received an Artium Baccalaureus degree from Centre College in 1943 and served as a Lieutenant (J.G.) in the United States Naval Reserve during World War II, from 1943 to 1946. He received a Bachelor of Laws from the University of Virginia School of Law in 1948, and was a law clerk to Judge Shackelford Miller Jr. of the United States Court of Appeals for the Sixth Circuit from 1948 to 1949. Lively was in private practice in Danville, Kentucky from 1949 to 1972.

Federal judicial service

On September 12, 1972, Lively was nominated by President Richard Nixon to a seat on the United States Court of Appeals for the Sixth Circuit vacated by Judge Henry Luesing Brooks. Lively was confirmed by the United States Senate on October 3, 1972, and received his commission on October 5, 1972. He served as Chief Judge from 1983 to 1988, assuming senior status on January 1, 1989. He stopped hearing cases on December 31, 2007, but remained in senior status until his death on March 12, 2016.

References

External links
 
 Papers of Judge Pierce Lively

1921 births
2016 deaths
Centre College alumni
University of Virginia School of Law alumni
Judges of the United States Court of Appeals for the Sixth Circuit
Lawyers from Louisville, Kentucky
People from Danville, Kentucky
United States court of appeals judges appointed by Richard Nixon
20th-century American judges
United States Navy officers
United States Navy personnel of World War II